The 2011 Pure Michigan 400  was a NASCAR Sprint Cup Series stock car race held on August 21, 2011 at Michigan International Speedway in Brooklyn, Michigan. Contested over 200 laps on the 2 -mile D-shaped oval, it was the 23rd race of the 2011 season. The race was won by Kyle Busch for the Joe Gibbs Racing team. Jimmie Johnson finished second, and Brad Keselowski clinched third.

Report

Background

Michigan International Speedway is one of six superspeedways to hold NASCAR races; the others are Daytona International Speedway, Auto Club Speedway, Indianapolis Motor Speedway, Pocono Raceway and Talladega Superspeedway. The track's turns are banked at eighteen degrees, while the front stretch, the location of the finish line, is banked at twelve degrees. The back stretch, has a five degree banking. Michigan International Speedway can seat up to 119,500 people.

Before the race, Kyle Busch and Carl Edwards were first and second in the Drivers' Championship with 752 points. Jimmie Johnson was third in the Drivers' Championship with 746 points, Kevin Harvick was fourth with 738 points, and Matt Kenseth was in fifth with 724 points. In the Manufacturers' Championship, Chevrolet was leading with 143 points, 15 points ahead of Ford. Toyota, with 118 points, was 23 points ahead of Dodge in the battle for third. Kevin Harvick was the race's defending champion.

Practice and qualifying
Two practice sessions are scheduled to be held in preparation for the race; one on August 19, 2011 and the other on the following day. The first session was 90 minutes long, while the second will be 110 minutes long. During the first practice session, Matt Kenseth, for the Roush Fenway Racing team, was quickest ahead of Ryan Newman in second and Greg Biffle in the third position. Mark Martin was scored fourth and David Ragan managed fifth. Paul Menard, Jeff Gordon, Jamie McMurray, Brad Keselowski, and Marcos Ambrose rounded out the top ten quickest drivers in the session.

Forty-six cars were entered for qualifying, but only forty-three could qualify for the race because of NASCAR's qualifying procedure. Biffle clinched the sixth pole position of his career, with a time of 37.826 seconds. He was joined on the front row of the grid by Kenseth. Newman qualified third, Denny Hamlin took fourth, and Martin started fifth. Keselowski, Ragan, Dale Earnhardt Jr., Gordon and McMurray rounded out the top ten. The drivers that failed to qualify for the race were Johnny Sauter, Erik Darnell and T. J. Bell. Following the qualifying session, Biffle commented, "We didn't know whether we were going to come here in race or qualifying trim. But we worked on a great qualifying set-up and obviously had good speed today. We'll work on things tomorrow on practice and hopefully have a great car on Sunday."

In the second and final practice, Martin was quickest with a time of 38.371 seconds. Kyle Busch followed in second, ahead of Johnson and Biffle. Gordon was fifth quickest, with a time of 38.452 seconds. Kurt Busch, Kenseth, Newman, Ragan, and Menard rounded out the first ten positions. Afterward, Martin discussed his feelings about the track, "I really, really like running at Michigan, not just because it's so fast, but it's so wide. We can race all over the track. I've been lucky at Michigan, and I've been just plain good. I've gotten a lot of wins there. Last time we raced there, we were pretty good. ... We've got to build on what we learned in that race and try to do even better this time around."

Results

Qualifying

Race results

Standings after the race

Drivers' Championship standings

Manufacturers' Championship standings

Note: Only the top five positions are included for the driver standings.

References

Pure Michigan 400
Pure Michigan 400
NASCAR races at Michigan International Speedway
Pure Michigan 400